The Coconut Religion is a religion founded by Ông Đạo Dừa in Ben Tre, South Vietnam. As one of many religions that existed in the South before communist authorities had abolished the religion on 1975. Dao Dua advocated religious harmony, synthesizing many religions, especially Buddhism and Christianity. The Coconut Religion is not currently recognized as a religion by the Vietnamese government.

History
The Coconut Religion was founded in 1963 by Vietnamese mystic and scholar Nguyễn Thành Nam, also known as the Coconut Monk, His Coconutship, Prophet of Concord, and Uncle Hai (19091990). Nam, who attended a French university, established a floating pagoda in the southern Vietnamese "Coconut Kingdom", in the province of Bến Tre. It is alleged that Nam consumed only coconuts for three years; for that period he also practiced meditation on a small pavement made from stone. Dừa was a candidate for the 1971 South Vietnamese presidential election but he would dropout after being afraid that he would be arrested and returned to his "Coconut Kingdom". Despite his eccentric behaviour, the government of Saigon respected him and called Nam a "man of religion". He usually sported a crucifix around his neck and dressed in traditional Buddhist robes. 

Estimates of followers of the religion worldwide were 4,000 at its highest. One notable follower was John Steinbeck IV, the son of American novelist John Steinbeck. The religion was deemed a "cult" and was promptly banned in 1975 by communist officials.

The Coconut Monk died in unexplained circumstances in 1990, marking the demise of the cult. The Coconut Estate is now served as a tourist attraction along the My Tho Mekong Delta Tour.

See also

 Religion in Vietnam

References

Religion in Vietnam
Buddhist new religious movements
1963 establishments in South Vietnam
Religious organizations established in 1963
Religious organizations disestablished in 1975
Organizations disestablished in 1975
1963 in religion
1975 disestablishments in Vietnam
Religious syncretism in Vietnam
Coconuts